Sport in Pakistan is a significant part of Pakistani culture. Cricket is the most popular sport in Pakistan, while field hockey, polo, and squash are also popular. Traditional sports like kabaddi and other well-known games are also played. The Pakistan Sports Board was created in 1962 by the Ministry of Education as a corporate body for the purposes of promoting and developing uniform standards of competition in sports in Pakistan comparable to the standards prevailing internationally, and regulating and controlling sports in Pakistan on a national basis. The Ministry of Culture, Sports and Tourism, now has control over the Pakistan Sports Board. The PSB controls all 39 sporting federations. The Pakistan Sports Board is supported by the Pakistan Sports Trust, which assists hard up players and associations so they can continue participating in sports.

Over recent years there has been an increase in sporting activity in Pakistan, with Pakistani sportsmen and women participating at many national and international events. Also, more international tournaments now take place in Pakistan. The size of the teams Pakistan sends, and the number of events they participate in, such as the Olympic Games, Asian Games, World Games, and Commonwealth Games has increased since the turn of the century.

National participation
Muhammad Ali Jinnah, the founder of Pakistan, had a great love for sport and fully realised the vital role it played in the development of nations and inculcation of discipline among the masses. In a meeting with the Organizing Committee of the First Pakistan Olympic Games held at Karachi, Jinnah said to the first President of the Pakistan Olympic Association Mr. Ahmed E.H.:

 "Dedicate yourself to sports promotion, for when you and I are gone, leadership will go into the hands of Youth, and Youth is our wealth, a raw material, that must be hammered into shape, into burnished steel to strive and smite in defence – the defence of the integrity and solidarity of Pakistan – the defence of the ideology of Pakistan."

The first National Games were held at Polo Ground, Karachi from 23 to 25 April 1948. Sportsmen and officials from East Pakistan (now Bangladesh) and all the integrated Provincial units of West Pakistan took part in these games. The total number of athletes was 140. No competitors were, however, invited from any foreign country. Competitions were held in basketball, boxing, cycling, track and field, volleyball, weightlifting, and wrestling.

Over the years, Pakistan has been held back due to the lack of funds placed in sports. Many facilities are substandard, causing Pakistan to fall behind other nations. In its early years the young state had been able to compete with much success, but during the late 1970s, with the government no longer investing in athletics, the country could no longer compete.

However, since the late 1990s, this trend has changed. Money is now being placed into sports, and many of the federations are now managed by people who are trying to push Pakistani sportsmen and -women forward. International tournaments are now hosted in the country, and the nation sends athletes to compete abroad. There has also been restructuring of national tournaments, and new facilities and equipment are being provided. This has seen overall results improve.

On March 3, 2009, 12 militants with guns, grenades, and rocket launchers attacked a bus carrying the Sri Lanka national cricket team to a match at Lahore's Gaddafi Stadium in Pakistan. Six Pakistani policemen escorting the team and two civilians were killed while seven Sri Lankan players and an assistant coach were injured. Since the terrorist attacks, no foreign cricket teams  toured Pakistan until 2015 when Zimbabwe toured for an away series. A month after the attack on the Sri Lankan team, the International Cricket Council relieved Pakistan of co-hosting duty for any 2011 Cricket World Cup games. Pakistan has tried to make the best of the situation by offering to host its "home" matches on neutral territory in the United Arab Emirates.  However, due to a decrease in terrorism in Pakistan over the past few years, as well as an increase in security, many teams have toured Pakistan since 2015. These teams include Zimbabwe, Sri Lanka, West Indies, Bangladesh, South Africa, Australia and an ICC World XI team. In addition, the Pakistan Super League has seen games hosted in Pakistan.

The Pakistan Sports Board is a government institution whereas the Pakistan Olympic Association is working under the shelter of the International Olympic Committee. Due to government interference, the Pakistan Olympic Association is very close to getting a ban from participation in Olympic Games. Due to cold war, Pakistani sport is also suffering but, there is no hope to resolve this problem due to government level dictatorship.

Cricket

Cricket is the most popular sport in Pakistan. Almost all districts and neighbourhoods in Pakistan have a cricket team and people start playing from a young age. Pakistan has won international cricket events, which include the 1992 Cricket World Cup, the 2009 ICC World Twenty20 and the 2017 ICC Champions Trophy besides finishing as runner-up in the 1999 Cricket World Cup, 2007 ICC World Twenty20 and the 2022 T20 World Cup. Pakistan also won the ACC Asia cup in 2000 and 2012 and all three versions of the Austral-Asia cup. Pakistan's cricket teams take part in domestic competitions such as the Quaid-e-Azam Trophy, the Patron's Trophy, ABN-AMRO Twenty-20 Cup, and the ABN-AMRO Champions Trophy.Pakistan Cricket Board also organize a franchise based T20 cricket league known as the Pakistan Super League . International Test and one-day matches are played between the Pakistan national cricket team and foreign opponents regularly. Women's cricket is also very popular, with Kiran Baluch holding the current record of the highest score in a women's test match with her innings of 242. The Pakistan Cricket Board controls both the men's and women's games. The 2020 Pakistan Super League events was hosted entirely by Pakistan.

Notable cricketers from Pakistan include Aaqib Javed, Ramiz Raja, Shoaib Akhtar, Younis Khan, Saqlain Mushtaq, Mushtaq Ahmed, Abdul Qadir, Wasim Akram, Zaheer Abbas, Javed Miandad, Saeed Anwar, Muhammad Yousaf, Inzamam-ul-Haq, Waqar Younis, Shahid Afridi, the Mohammad brothers (Hanif, Mushtaq, Sadiq and Wazir) and Imran Khan. Imran Khan has been named in the ICC Cricket Hall of Fame. Saeed Anwar's 194 runs against India remained the record for most runs by a batsman in an ODI for 11 years which was broken by Fakhar Zaman's 210 against Zimbabwe in 2018. Shoaib Akhtar holds the record of delivering the fastest delivery in the history of cricket. Shahid Afridi holds numerous records i.e. the 3rd fastest century in ODIs, the highest number of sixes in international cricket. Wasim Akram at the time of his retirement had taken the most wickets in ODIs. Muhammad Yousuf has scored the most Test runs in a calendar year.

Field hockey

The Pakistan Hockey Federation (PHF) is the national governing body of field hockey in Pakistan. The Pakistan Hockey Federation Women Wing (PHFWW) is the official organisation of women's field hockey in Pakistan. The Pakistan national field hockey team has won 3 gold medals at the Olympic Games, and lifted the Hockey World Cup 4 times, a World Record. It has also won the most Asian gold medals, and is the only Asian team to have won the prestigious Champions Trophy with 3 titles. It used to be consistently ranked amongst the top teams in the world. However, lately there has been a decline in results, with the national team failing to qualify for both the 2016 and 2020 Olympics. Also, because of the PHF's poor economy, there was a span of two  years without any international matches netween 2019 and 2021. As of April 2022 the team is ranked 18th in the world. Notable players include World-Record holder Waseem Ahmad, Mohammed Saqlain, and Sohail Abbas. The player with most matches is Waseem Ahmad.

Football

Pakistan is known as the manufacturer of the official FIFA World Cup ball. Yet, as in most parts of South Asia, football is not especially popular in Pakistan. The Pakistan Football Federation (PFF) is the governing body in Pakistan. Football is played mostly on the local level, primarily in Balochistan and the Swat Valley. These areas provide most of the players on the Pakistan national football team. The Pakistan Football Federation Women Organizing Committee (PFFWOC) is responsible for women's football in Pakistan. In 2004, the Pakistan Premier League was established; it is the first division of Pakistani football. The Pakistan National Football Challenge Cup is the national "knockout" cup competition in Pakistani football, run by the Pakistan Football Federation. The Pakistan National Women's Football Championship is the annual women's championship. Notable players include Muhammad Essa, Zeshan Rehman, and Haroon Yousaf.

Squash

Squash is a popular sport that has a large following in Pakistan, with Pakistan dominating the sport for a period of time. Jahangir Khan, who remained unbeaten in a world record 555 consecutive squash matches, and Jansher Khan are considered legends of the sport and have won several World Squash Championships and other tournaments. Combined they have won 14 world opens, making Pakistan the most decorated Squash nation in the world. Pakistani players have won the Squash World Open 17 times, and British Open 12 times, the highest by any nation. Carla Khan, one of Pakistan's most successful sportswomen, is one of a number of men and women who represent Pakistan. The Pakistan Squash Federation is the governing body in the country. The Pakistan Open tournament is one of the premier events of the sport in the country. Every province of the country holds its own men's and women's championships. Some other notable players from Pakistan include Hashim Khan, Torsam Khan, Mobillah Khan, and Qamar Zaman.

Polo

Polo is believed to have originated in Persia, and continues to be an important sport within the country with several large annual competitions. The Shandur Polo Tournament, played at the world's highest polo ground every June, is one of the biggest tourist draws to Chitral and Gilgit in Northern Pakistan. The Shandur Pass was picked as the location, because at 11,000 ft above sea level, it was seen as a ridge between heaven and hell. Key tournaments of the season are the Uprising Day tournament in early November in Gilgit, or the Pakistan Independence Day tournament in Skardu, early August. The Pakistan Polo Association (PPA) organises the sport, and the national side takes part in the Polo World Cup. Polo is played professionally with a number of Argentine players playing in Pakistan. Notable players include Murad Ismail, Raja Sami Ullah, Raza Muhammad Ali Khan Bangash, and Hissam Ali Haider. Raza Bangash is Pakistan's number-one player since June 2009, playing for the President's Body Guard team.

Tent pegging

Tent pegging is a popular sport in Pakistan, especially in Punjab, KPK and some parts of Sindh and Balochistan provinces. The Equestrian & Tent Pegging Federation of Pakistan, formed in 2014, is the highest governing body who organises the sport in Pakistan. There are various clubs across the country who also organise an event as well. The sport is the major event of National Horse & Cattle Show held at Fortress Stadium Lahore. Pakistanis compete in various international events notably the World Cup which commenced in 2014.

Notable tent peggers from Pakistan include Malik Ata Muhammad Khan, Khan Qamar Zaman Khan, Mian Javed Akhtar Gujjar, Amer Munawer, Shahbaz Qamar, Ch Rashid Mehmood, Haroon Bandial, Ashraf Hayat Gondal and Raja Zarrar Sajjad. Malik Ata Muhammad Khan is currently serving as Vice President in the International Tent Pegging Federation. Malik Ata Muhammd Khan is one of the founders of International Tent Pegging Federation to address the Fédération Equestre Internationale (FEI).

Athletics

The Athletics Federation of Pakistan (AFP) organises athletic tournaments in Pakistan. Pakistani athletes compete in various athletic events. Some Pakistani athletes have excelled in various events in the distant past including Abdul Khaliq, Ghulam Raziq, Mubarak Shah, John Permal, Muhammad Talib, Ahmed Sajjad Cheema, Abid Hussain, Arshad Saleem, Ali Kamani and Nawaz, Mohammad Alam, and Muhammad Younis are some of the athletes who got prominence at either Asian or International levels, or both, winning gold medals for Pakistan. In the early decades, Pakistanis held many Asian records including the Asian 100 m and 200 m record held by Abdul Khaliq. Pakistani female athletes have also represented Pakistan at international level, such as Shabana Akhtar, who was the first Pakistani female athlete to participate at the Olympics. International events such as the Lahore Marathon take place in the country.

Australian Rules Football

Australian rules football was established in Pakistan in 2006. The governing body is the Australian Rules Football Federation of Pakistan. There are currently six Aussie rules football teams in Pakistan, all based in the Swat Valley around an educational institution. The Pakistan national side are known as the Dragoons.

Badminton

The Pakistan Badminton Federation, formed in 1953, organises the sport in Pakistan. Men's players such as Irshad Ahmed and Saeed Malik, and Women's players like Elsie Hunt and Nighat Sultana, have won a number of tournaments. Pakistan's golden era was between the 1950s and 1970s. In Pakistan talent is emerging on a district and Punjab level. In 2009, a player named Toqeer Shah performed very well and won a gold medal at Punjab level. But due to controversial issues with Punjab Badminton Federation Toqeer Shah resigned. Pakistan earned its first Olympic Badminton Qualification when Mahoor Shahzad qualified for the 2020 Tokyo Summer Olympics.

Ball hockey

Ball hockey is a game similar or basically the same sport as ice hockey, but played in shoes, without skates, not on ice. The Pakistan national ball hockey team is composed of Canadian Pakistanis, born in Canada or with links to that nation. The sport is growing in the South Asian community there. Pakistan competed for the first time at the World Championships in 2009. They finished 3rd out of 4 in Group B behind only Bermuda and ice hockey giants Finland, and ahead of Cayman Islands. In the next world championships, they also participated and were champions of their group after defeating France in extra time. The Pakistan national ball hockey team is developing and improving, and in 2013 were awarded Pool A status, competing for gold in St. Johns, Newfoundland.

Ball badminton

The Ball Badminton Federation of Pakistan was established in 2007. Pakistani men's and women's teams participated in the first Asian Ball Badminton Championship in Amritsar, India from 4 to 6 October. The men's team came fourth and the women's team came second.

Baseball

In 2006, Pakistan Federation Baseball hosted the 7th Asian Baseball Championship, and again from 2010 through 2017, with the national team winning the tournament from 2010 through 2015.

Basketball

Basketball was introduced to Pakistan around 1900 and is especially popular in Lahore and Karachi. The Pakistan Basketball Federation has been part of FIBA since 1958. Six teams play in the Pakistan first division. The National Women Basketball Championship is the Women's Basketball tournament.

Billiards and snooker

Snooker is one of the rising sports in Pakistan, and it has been taken up by many people. There has been success at the international level; Mohammed Yousuf was the 1994 IBSF World Snooker Champion and the 2006 IBSF World Masters Champion; and Shokat Ali is the Pakistan number one player and an Asian Games Gold medalist. The Pakistan Billiards Snooker Association (PBSA) was formed in 1958.

Bowling
Pakistan Tenpin Bowling Federation is affiliated with Asian Bowling Federation and World Bowling. The Federation is affiliated with Pakistan Sports Board.

Sqay

Sqay is one of the rising sports in Pakistan, and it has been taken up by many people.

Chess

In Pakistan, chess is played throughout the country, mostly in Mughal style which is slightly different from the international style, but the Chess Federation of Pakistan (CFP) organises its tournaments in international style and according to the established rules. The FIDE has awarded the International Master title to Shahzad Mirza and Mahmood Lodhi.

Caving

The Pakistan Cave Research & Caving Federation is the only National governing body of caving adventure sports in Pakistan jointly working with Chiltan Adventurers Association Balochistan the pioneer association of Speleology / Caving in Pakistan.  The head office of PCRCF is based in Haji Mohammad Yousaf Khan Khilji Memorial Sports Academy Quetta. There are many caves for cavers and tourists to visit it especially the Juniper Shaft Cave, the Murghagull Gharra cave, Mughall saa cave, Pir Ghaib Cave, and naturally decorated cave of Pakistan. Pakistan is a member country through Hayatullah Khan Durrani to the Union International de Spéléologie (UIS). Hayatullah Khan Durrani is Pakistan's first eminent Legendary cave explorer of international repute and founder of caving adventure sports in Pakistan.

Cycling

The Pakistan Cycling Federation is the governing body of cycling in Pakistan. The Tour de Pakistan International Cycling Race starts from Karachi and ends in Peshawar, with about 150 domestic and international cyclists taking part every year. This race is among the largest of such events in Asia, covering a distance of 1,648 km in eleven stages with four days of rest en route. Teams from WAPDA, Pakistan Army, Pakistan Railways, and Sui Southern Gas Company, along with teams of the four provinces regularly take part in domestic and international cycling tournaments. Women's cycling also takes place in the country. Other events are the Tour of Islamabad and the MTB Tour of the Himalayas.

Cycle polo

The Pakistan Federation of Cycle Polo is the governing body of this sport in Pakistan. The goal of this organization is to represent cycle polo in Pakistan. Cycle polo is already an international sport, with a large following in Pakistan, India, Sri Lanka, Bangladesh, Malaysia, United States of America, Canada, France, Norway, United Kingdom, Ireland, Poland, Argentina, and other parts of the world. There is also a desire to re-introduce cycle polo in the Olympic Games.

Equestrian sports

Equestrianism had traditionally been limited to the upper-echelon of Pakistani society up until the end of the 20th century. This resulted in private sponsorship and government funding (PST) for the sport. Pakistan Eventing was launched in July 2005 in partnership with The Equestrian & Tent Pegging Federation of Pakistan with an attempt to qualify Pakistan to its first Olympic equestrian qualification. Pakistan Eventing is not just about equestrian; it was a simple idea conceptualised by the commitment of those who supported the concept. The ultimate objective was to compete at an international level (FEI) and qualify for the Olympics.

Gymnastics

The Pakistan Gymnastic Federation has been affiliated with the International Gymnastics Federation (FIG) since 1958. Pakistan sends individuals and teams to international events such as the Olympic Games.

Golf

Pakistan has qualified for the Golf World Cup a total of 4 times, in 1975, 1977, 1982, and recently in 2009, when they finished joint 22nd out of the 28 qualifying teams. The Pakistan Golf Federation (PGF) run golf in Pakistan. Karachi Golf Club is one of the oldest in the country and it is where the Pakistan Open takes place. The Pakistan Open was founded in 1967 and became an Asian Tour event in 2006. Chris Rodgers won the Pakistan Open in 2006. The 2007 event was held in January and had an increased prize money purse of $330,000 US. Taimur Hussain has been Pakistan's most successful golfer, as he won the 1998 Myanmar Open, becoming the first Pakistani to win on the Asian Tour.

Handball

Handball was first played in 1984 in an exhibition event, and was taken up by the Pakistan Olympic Association. The Pakistan Handball Federation is a member of the Asia Handball Federation. In beach handball, Pakistan is ranked first in Asia.3rd World Beach Handball Championship held from 9 to 13 July 2008 in Cadiz, Spain. Pakistan obtained 5th position and qualified for the World Games. Pakistan Handball team won one Gold medal in the 11th South Asian Games 2010, Dhaka, Bangladesh. Pakistan obtained one silver medal during IHF Challenge Trophy 2010 held in Dhaka. Pakistan also participated in the Beach Handball World Cup in 2008. There is enough talent at domestic level also. Pakistan won the gold medal at the first Beach Asian Games in Bali, Indonesia.

Ice hockey

Pakistan has an ice hockey team but it is not part of the IIHF. Pakistan applied for a membership but the congress postponed it until it had a better structure. However, Pakistan has deep roots in ice hockey in the northern parts of Gilgit-Baltistan province.

Kabaddi

Kabaddi is a famous sport in Pakistan. The governing body for Kabaddi in Pakistan is Pakistan Kabaddi Federation. Pakistan won the 2020 Kabaddi World Cup (Circle style) at the National Stadium in Lahore, after a close contest against India by 43–41.

Motorsport

The Motorsport Association of Pakistan (MAP) is a member of the Federation Internationale de L'Automobile FIA. The Pakistan National Karting Championship was the first motor racing curcit competition in Pakistan, and is used to develop rookie drivers. The Freedom Rally is a yearly off-road race which takes place during the Independence celebrations.

Nur B. Ali was the first Pakistani Racing driver and Co-founded the MAP. He drives in the ARCA RE/MAX Series and is a former two-time Southwest Formula Mazda Regional Series champion. Ali was also the driver of the A1GP Team Pakistan in 2006. Syed Ovais Naqvi is the first local and homegrown professional Pakistani Racecar Driver and he is also the first Pakistani to acquire the International B Racing license, he also co-founded the MAP and is the General Secretary of the body. Ovais was also responsible for putting together the Pakistan National Karting Championship. Omer Younas is currently racing in the Formula BMW Pacific and Adnan Sarwar races in Formula Rolon. In 2005, the A1 Team Pakistan was run by Adam Langley-Khan, Khan returned to Team Pakistan for the 2007/08 season and remains the Team Pakistan driver. He also drives in the Euroseries 3000.

Mountaineering

With the greatest concentration of the highest peaks of the world many of them very challenging climbs, Pakistan is a prime location for skilled mountain climbers. Five peaks are over 8,000 meters. The Alpine Club of Pakistan (ACP) founded in 1974, is the national mountaineering and climbing federation. Chiltan Adventurers Association Balochistan is the major affiliated unit of ACP founded in 1984. Nazir Sabir, Ashraf Aman, Hayatullah Khan Durrani Lt.Col Abdul Jabbar Bhatti, Col Sher Khan and Meherban Karim are Pakistan's most experienced mountaineers.

Pakistan Alpine Institute is the pioneer of "big wall climbing" in Pakistan. Pakistan's First Big Wall Climbing Expedition has been successfully completed by Imran Junaidi and Usman Tariq in September, 2013.

Samina Baig is the first Pakistani woman and the third Pakistani to climb Mount Everest. She is also the youngest Muslim woman to climb Everest, having done so at the age of 21. Samina is also the first Pakistani woman and the first Muslim to climb the seven summits.

Roller skating

The Pakistan Federation of Roller Skating (PFRS) is the national governing body of roller sports in Pakistan. The Federation started about 25 years ago in Lahore, Pakistan, founded by Khalid Saeed and his team.

Rope skipping

The Rope Skipping Federation of Pakistan is the national federation working for rope skipping in Pakistan. Affiliated with the Asian Rope Skipping Federation and the International Rope Skipping Federation

Rugby union

The Pakistan Rugby Union was formally established in 2000 and gained memberships with the Asian Rugby Football Union in 2000. In 2003, Pakistan fielded a national team for the first time, participating in the Provincial Tournament in Sri Lanka. In November 2004, it participated in the 19th Asian championship in Hong Kong. The Pakistan Rugby Union then became an associate member of the International Rugby Board (IRB).

There are three major clubs in Pakistan, which include Islamabad Rugby Football Club (IRFC) also known as the "JINNS", Lahore Rugby Football Club (LRFC), and Karachi Rugby Football Club (KRFC).

The latest landmark for Pakistan rugby is that universities like Lahore University of Management and Sciences (LUMS) and Bahria University Islamabad have formed teams as well.

Shooting

Shooting in Pakistan governed by National Rifle Association of Pakistan. Irshad Ali with one silver and two bronzes in the Commonwealth Games being one of the most successful at international level. Amin Karamat having participated in several international events and being the most achieving skeet shooter. He recently won the bronze medal in Asian Clay shooting championship in 2010 in Bangkok, setting a record of 121/125 in the Asian Games in Doha and winning team bronze in Asian Clay Shooting in 2008.

Skiing

The Ski Federation of Pakistan, created in December 1990, run the sport. Despite being a country with many mountains, the sport has never taken off until the late 1990s. Up until then, it was only done by the Pakistan Army. Now there have been facilities put in place so that the sport can be played, and the Ski Federation of Pakistan now sends out teams to international tournaments.

Muhammad Abbas and Muhammad Karim represented Pakistan at 2010 Winter Olympics and 2014 Winter Olympics respectively.

Sports climbing

The Pakistan Sports Climbing Federation is the only governing body for sports climbing activities/sports in Pakistan. The headquarters of PSCF is in Quetta, Balochistan.

Table tennis

The Pakistan Table Tennis Federation runs the sport in the country. Farjad Saif is the only player in Pakistan Table Tennis history to represent the country in the olympics, participating in the 1988 Seoul Games. He did exceedingly well eventually ending the Olympic games with a ranking of 25th in the world. He also holds a record 13 national titles also being the only individual to win the title 7 times in a row.

Tennis

Tennis is a very popular sport and Pakistanis compete in various international events. The Pakistan Tennis Federation (PTF) organise the game in the country. Khawaja Saeed Hai was the first Pakistani to reach a Grand Slam tournament, playing at Wimbledon, the US Open, and the French Open where he made it to the third round. Haroon Rahim was a very successful player, he was the winner of a number of ATP Singles and Doubles titles. Lately, Aisam-ul-Haq created history in Pakistani tennis, as he reached the finals of 2010 US Open – Men's Doubles and 2010 US Open – Mixed Doubles.

The Pakistan Davis Cup team have previously reached the world group play-offs, with the help of Aisam-ul-Haq Qureshi, currently Pakistan's number one, and Aqeel Khan, the number two. Tennis events are very rare in Pakistan and there is hardly an international tennis event, apart from ATP tournaments.

Volleyball

Volleyball is a popular sport in the Pakistan Armed Forces. Inter-services games are played regularly, and most players of the Pakistani volleyball team are from the armed forces. This game is also gaining popularity among private school students in Karachi and Islamabad.
Pakistan Volleyball Federation is the governing body of Volleyball in Pakistan.

Vovinam

Vovinam is a emerging sport in Pakistan, Pakistan Vovinam Federation is the governing body of Vovinam in Pakistan, Federation is non profit organization which is coordinate with Punjab Sindh Khyber Pakhtunkhwa Baluchistan Islamabad Azad Kashmir and Gilgit-bultistan provinces Vovinam Associations. Pakistani Vovinam team also Participated in international Vovinam Championships and got silver and bronze medals, 2013 and 2019.

Weightlifting

The Pakistan Weightlifting Federation was formed in 1953. Pakistan has picked up a number of medals over the years in weightlifting. Shuja-Ud-Din Malik won gold in the Men's 85 kg. Combined at the 2006 Commonwealth Games.

Wrestling

Wrestling has always been an important sport in Pakistan, with regular tournaments played locally. It has seen Pakistan win medals at international games, such as Muhammed Akhtar, a 3-time gold medalist in 2007. Gama Pahalwan was an undefeated World Wrestling Champion from Pakistan. Gama Pahalwan's nephew Bholu Pahalwan also represented Pakistan in wrestling.
The Pakistan Wrestling Federation (PWF) is the national governing body of sport of Wrestling in the Pakistan.

Gulli Danda

Gulli Danda is a traditional game in Pakistan. From there, it was introduced in Asia. It is most famous in the South Asia. This game is mostly played in the rural areas of Pakistan.

Combat sports
The Pakistan Boxing Federation (PBF) organises boxing matches in Pakistan. The Pakistan Amateur Boxing Federation (PABF) organises amateur matches. Pakistan has seen success at amateur level boxing, despite lack of necessary equipment and facilities. They have won medals at the Olympic and Commonwealth Games. Quetta born Haider Ali won gold at the 2002 Commonwealth Games as a Featherweight and went on to become a professional boxer. Umar Khan is a member of the Pakistan Boxing Federation. He is also a member of Pakistan under-19 team and has won different titles against Malaysia and the Philippines. He is currently the captain of Under-19 team. He has won 13 gold and 10 silver medals at the international level.

Pakistan has many karate clubs of different styles and they are holding their regular tournaments at national and regional levels. Karate is also a regular part of school sport programmes. Grand Master Muhammad Ashraf Tai is the first and only martial arts Master Pioneer in Pakistan who developed his unique system of karate named bando having scientific approach and Olympic spirit. Due to natural talent and hard training Ghulam Ali and Saadi Abbas have won gold medals at the SAF Games.

Nadeem Azhar Lone was technical official of ninth SAF games with Pakistan karate team. Farman Ahmed of Rawalpindi won double crown in this championship along with other karate players. Pakistan won seven golds and one silver on first attempt in the history of any international karate tournament. After that the success story is not ended Pakistan have participated in Asian Karate championship and also won number of gold medals in karate tournament held in Iran. Pakistan Karate Federation's Mr Jahangir is striving hard to promote this sports in Pakistan. Today some players from District Multan performing well. From Multan Zaigham Rajpoot, Toqeer shah and ali played at National and Asian level.

Kurash is the national sport in Uzbekistan. It is a form of martial art. It is played like Judo/Kushti/Wrestling, between two players, male and female separately in 7 different weight categories each. Kurash has been recognised as a martial art, Olympic sport by Olympic Council of Asia.

Taekwondo in Pakistan is run by the Pakistan Taekwondo Federation, and it started in Pakistan during the 1970s when some Korean taekwondo masters visited there and established a handful of clubs. Over the years it has spread all over the country, albeit slowly for the most part. However, it seems to have enjoyed more growth than any other sport (arguably), during the last ten years. And young boys played international championships around the world.

Vovinam (Việt Võ Đạo) is a traditional combative martial art originating in Vietnam. It is on the Charter of Olympic Council of Asia. The Pakistan Vovinam Federation, which coordinates provincial associations, is the organism promoting Vovinam from the amateur to the international level in Pakistan. The Federation is part of the World Vovinam Federation (WVVF), the Asian Vovinam Federation (AVF), the South Asian Vovinam Federation (SAVF) and the Islamic World Vovinam Federation (IWVF). The Pakistani Vovinam team has competed in international Vovinam Championships and won silver and bronze medals, including a bronze medal at the 6th World Vovinam Championship of 2020 in Cambodia.

Water sports

Canoe Kayak

The Pakistan Canoe and Kayak Federation is the only official governing body of canoe and kayak sports in Pakistan. The headquarters of PCKF is based in the Hayat Durrani Water Sports Academy at Hanna Lake Quetta, one of the major canoe / kayak paddling and Rowing center in Pakistan. PCKF is affiliated on international level with International Canoe Federation International Canoe Federation (ICF) and on Asian level with Asian Canoe Confederation (ACC), and on National level recognised with Pakistan Sports Board. The Kayaking National Champions Mohammad Abubakar Durrani, Mohammad Shoaib Khilji and Farhanullah Kakar belongs to HDWSA and Pakistan Customs Canoe & Kayak team Quetta.

Rowing
Karachi and Quetta are the major centers of rowing in Pakistan. The National Rowing Championship is the major national event of rowing in the country. The Pakistan Rowing Federation was a founding member of the Asian Rowing Federation. Although Pakistani rowers take part in events, it is considered a minority sport. Rowers like Ali Hassan, Maqbool Ali, Zohaib Zia Hashmi, and Muhammad Asad Khan have won medals at international events and in International School Rowing events. Junior Rowers from Balochistan, such as Mehardil Khan Baabai and Mirwaise Khan Baabai won many medals.

Sailing

The Pakistan Sailing Federation is the national body, with Karachi and Balochistan Sailing/Yachting Association's as its major units. Byram Dinshawji Avari represented Pakistan at the 1978 Asian Games in Bangkok, and again at the 1982 Asian Games in New Delhi. He also won a silver medal at the Enterprise World Championship held in Canada in 1978. In 2004, Mohammad Tanveer of Pakistan won silver medal in Mistral Asian Championship held in Bombay. Shazli Tahir won silver and Junaid Ahmed won bronze medal in first CAS International Sailing Championship in April 2008.

Swimming

Up until recently, swimming struggled as a sport in Pakistan. But there has been a surge in interest, particularly with Rubab Raza. She was the youngest Olympic Pakistani competitor in Pakistan's history, aged 13 at the 2004 Summer Olympics. Kiran Khan known as "Golden Girl" also came to attention when she won 7 gold medals, 3 silver medals and 3 bronze medals at 28 National Games in 2001.
Pakistan Swimming Federation is the governing body of swimming in the Pakistan

The Pakistan Game Fishing Association organizes angling and fishing in Pakistan.

List of sports leagues

Cricket
 Pakistan Super League
 Pakistan Junior League
 Kashmir Premier League
 The Women's League

Football
 Pakistan Premier League
 National Women Football Championship

Hockey
 Pakistan Hockey Super League

Golf
 Pakistan Open

Boxing
 Super Boxing League

Kabaddi
 Super Kabaddi League

National Games

International Participation
 Pakistan at the Olympics
 Pakistan at the Paralympics
 Pakistan at the Commonwealth Games
 Pakistan at the World Games
 Pakistan at the World Athletics Championships
 Pakistan at the Asian Games
 Pakistan at the Asian Beach Games
 Pakistan at the South Asian Games
 Pakistan at the Islamic Solidarity Games
 Pakistan at the Military World Games
 Pakistan at the Cricket World Cup
 Pakistan at the World Beach Games
 Pakistan at the Asian Indoor and Martial Arts Games

See also

 Culture of Pakistan
 List of stadiums in Pakistan
 Pakistan Olympic Association
 National Games of Pakistan
 Larkana Bulls
 Health in Pakistan

References

External links
 Sports Board Punjab
 Pakistan Sports Board
 Pakistan's track and field history
 Official website of the 31st National Games, Peshawar Pakistan